Joshua M. "Josh" Linkner (born July 28, 1970) is an American entrepreneur, keynote speaker, and author. He founded several companies including ePrize, an interactive promotion agency, where he served as CEO and Executive chairman. Writing for The Wall Street Journal, Gwendolyn Bounds noted that ePrize is targeted at small businesses that don't have the resources to do this type of marketing themselves but cautioned that the service is not of the pay-per-sale type.

Since 2010 Linkner has served as CEO and Managing Partner of Detroit Venture Partners, a venture capital firm helping to rebuild urban areas through technology and entrepreneurship. Detroit Venture Partners' portfolio includes DJ app Rockbot, mobile app developer Detroit Labs, and CAPTCHA replacement company Are You a Human. General partners of Detroit Venture Partners include Earvin "Magic" Johnson Jr. On September 1, 2014, Linkner became a partner of High Level Marketing, a Michigan-based digital marketing agency. On November 4, 2014, Linkner announced he will step down as CEO of Detroit Venture Partners to focus on a speaker and author career.

Biography
Linkner was born to a Jewish family and believes that "being Jewish gives you a leg up....As Jews, we have a rich legacy of resiliency, a rich heritage of overcoming odds, We don’t make excuses."
Linkner has published four books, the first Leaning Forward: Surviving/Winning in the Future of Interactive Marketing in 2007, a New York Times best-seller Disciplined Dreaming: A Proven System to Drive Breakthrough Creativity in 2011, in 2014 a New York Times best-seller The Road to Reinvention: How to Drive Disruption and Accelerate Transformation, and in 2017 Hacking Innovation: The New Growth Model from the Sinister World of Hackers. In Disciplined Dreaming he states that the original thought and imagination of jazz performance (in his particular case, playing guitar with his jazz ensemble Guymon Ensley Quintet) are transferable skills for creating value in the business world. GetAbstract said the book provides "a clear, methodical guide to developing creativity". His third book, The Road to Reinvention: How to Drive Disruption and Accelerate Transformation, was published May 7, 2014.

He is a regular writer for Fast Company, Inc. Magazine, and Forbes. Linkner was one of the speakers at TEDx Detroit in September 2011.

On August 18, 2011, U.S. President Barack Obama gave Linkner a Champion of Change award in the youth entrepreneur category. He won an Ernst & Young Entrepreneur of the Year award in the Realizing Business Potential category for Central Great Lakes Region in 2004.

Linkner studied jazz guitar at Berklee College of Music, was an Advertising major as an undergraduate at University of Florida, and holds honorary doctorate degrees from Lawrence Technological University and Walsh College.
He is also Entrepreneur-In-Residence and Adjunct Professor of Applied Creativity at the University of Michigan-Dearborn.

On August 30, 2013, Linkner wrote a column for the Detroit Free Press suggesting that Labor Day be retired, repurposed, and renamed Appreciation Day, Passion Day, Kindness Day, or Give Back Day.

In an interview with Vanna Le of Forbes magazine, he stated he was optimistic about growth in high technology and innovation in general, with the exception of social media.

In a 2014 article in the New Yorker magazine, Harvard historian Jill Lepore criticized the theory of disruptive innovation as "a theory of change founded on panic, anxiety, and shaky evidence".  Lepore postulates that Linkner advises the aspiring disruptive innovators (in which he invests) that "the world is a terrifying place, moving at a devastating pace".  She suggests that Linkner's "job appears to be to convince a generation of people who want to do good and do well to learn, instead, remorselessness.  Forget rules, obligations, your conscience, loyalty, a sense of the commonweal."

References

1970 births
Living people
Berklee College of Music alumni
University of Florida alumni
21st-century American businesspeople
20th-century American Jews
Place of birth missing (living people)
American business writers
American business theorists
Business speakers
American chief executives
American motivational speakers
American motivational writers
Jazz-blues guitarists
Jazz-blues musicians
American venture capitalists
21st-century American Jews